Cedar Walton Plays is an album by pianist Cedar Walton which was recorded in 1986 and released on the Delos label in 1993.

Reception 

In his review on Allmusic, Scott Yanow states "Pianist Cedar Walton heads a medium-size group on this 1986 Delos CD, a rhythm section with bassist Ron Carter and drummer Billy Higgins plus a five piece horn section ... Unfortunately the horns mostly stick to ensemblework but Walton and his trio are in top form".

Track listing 
All compositions by Cedar Walton except where noted.
 "Willow Weep for Me" (Ann Ronell) – 9:31
 "Hallucinations" (Bud Powell) – 5:44
 "Bremond's Blues" – 4:24
 "So in Love" (Cole Porter) – 10:51
 "Book's Bossa" (Walter Book, Cedar Walton) – 6:38
 "Out of the Past" (Benny Golson) – 11:20
 "He's a Real Gone Guy" (Nellie Lutcher) – 6:39
 "Something in Common" – 7:01

Personnel 
Cedar Walton – piano
Don Sickler – trumpet
Steve Turre – trombone
Kenny Garrett – alto saxophone
Lou Orensteen – tenor saxophone
Charles Davis – baritone saxophone
Ron Carter – bass
Billy Higgins – drums

References 

Cedar Walton albums
1987 albums
Delos Records albums